Nquma is a genus of sea snails, marine gastropod mollusks in the family Horaiclavidae.

Species
Species within the genus Nquma include:
 Nquma rousi (Sowerby III, 1886)
 Nquma scalpta Kilburn, 1988

References

External links
  Tucker, J.K. 2004 Catalog of recent and fossil turrids (Mollusca: Gastropoda). Zootaxa 682:1-1295.

 
Horaiclavidae
Gastropod genera